Rancho El Pinole was a  Mexican land grant along Carquinez Strait in present-day Contra Costa County, California.

It was given in 1842 by Governor Juan Alvarado to Ygnacio Martinez.  Rancho El Pinole extended over land that today includes most of the Franklin Ridge, Crockett, Hercules, Martinez, Oleum, Pinole, Rodeo, Selby and Tormey.

History
Ygnacio Martínez (1774–1848) was commandant of the Presidio of San Francisco from 1822–1827, and again from 1828–1832, and was a member of the town council in 1824 and 1827. Martinez retired in 1831.   Martinez represented to the Mexican authorities in 1834, that in consideration of his military service, Governor Luís Antonio Argüello in 1823 gave him title to a tract of land known as Pinole y Cañada del Hambre. Martinez  stated that he had lost his title papers. Record evidence was not found to support his claim, and he was required to petition anew, which he did in 1837. While proceedings were pending upon the Martinez petition, Felipe Briones in 1839, also petitioned for a grant of El Pinole. In 1842, Governor Alvarado, made a four square league grant of Rancho El Pinole to Ygnacio Martinez, and a three square league  grant of Rancho Boca de la Cañada del Pinole to Briones.

Martínez did not move his family to the rancho until 1836, living until that time at the Pueblo of San José. To fulfill the requirements upon which grants were made by the government, he proceeded to build a home and other homes of adobe in the valley of Pinole about two and half miles from San Pablo Bay. Martinez occupied and cultivated a large portion of the land, and set out a vineyard and fruit orchards.  Ygnacio Martinez died in 1848, and his eleven children inherited his property. Ygnacio Martinez’s daughter, Maria A. Martinez, was married to William A. Richardson. Martinez's daughter Susana, was married to Colonel William M. Smith.

With the cession of California to the United States following the Mexican-American War, the 1848 Treaty of Guadalupe Hidalgo provided that the land grants would be honored.  As required by the Land Act of 1851, a claim was filed with the Public Land Commission in 1852, and the grant was patented to María Antonia Martínez de Richardson et al.  in 1868. 

Later the heirs of William Welch of the adjacent Rancho Las Juntas, who owned the property on the east side of Arroyo del Hambre (Alhambra Creek), contributed another  to be included in the new town.

In 1865, John Tormey purchased  of the Rancho El Pinole from some of the Martinez heirs. And in 1867, John Tormey and his brother Patrick  purchased an additional    from the Martinez heirs.  The Tormey brothers divided their purchase into two portions.  John Tormey took the western half, which encompassed Pinole and additional parts of the Pinole and Briones Valleys. Patrick Tormey's share to the north and east, included the Rodeo Valley and what would eventually become the towns of Rodeo, Oleum, Selby and Tormey.

Historic sites
Vicente Martinez Adobe.  A two-story adobe ranch house built in 1849 by Ygnacio Martinez's son Vicente J. Martínez.  In 1853, Vicente sold the adobe to Edward Franklin, after whom  Franklin Canyon in which the adobe was located was named, and the adobe was known as the Franklin Canyon Adobe.
Fernandez Mansion.  During the 1850s Bernardo Fernandez, a Portuguese immigrant, started a trading facility on the shores of San Pablo Bay and eventually built the historic Fernandez Mansion.
Samuel Tennent House. The 1851 home of early Anglo-American settler in Contra Costa County, Dr. Samuel J. Tennent, who married Ygnacio Martinez’s daughter Rafaela. Tennent, through his wife Rafaela, owned much of the land in the area.

References

Pinole, El
El Pinole
Carquinez Strait
Hercules, California
Martinez, California
Pinole, California
El Pinole